Kedma is a 2002 Israeli film directed by Amos Gitai and starring Andrei Kashkar and Helena Yaralova. It was entered into the 2002 Cannes Film Festival.

Plot
The film is a historical tragedy set during the opening stages of Israel's 1948 War of Independence. The film follows the fate of a group of refugees from the Holocaust who are illegally brought to Israel by the Palmach. When they arrive, they are chased by British soldiers. Once they escape, they are immediately drafted into the war, and take part in a grueling battle against Arab irregulars. The film centers on two long monologues, one by an Arab peasant who pledges to oppose the Jews forever; and one by an emotionally demolished refugee who laments the seemingly endless suffering of his people. Gitai intended the film to be a more realistic answer to the romanticized depiction of the war in Otto Preminger's Exodus. The final shot of Kedma is identical to the final shot of Preminger's film.

References

External links
 
Kedma's review from The Jewish Channel
 Stephen Holden (February 7, 2003). Film Review; War-Weary Immigrants Facing Another War. New York Times

2000s German-language films
2002 multilingual films
2002 films
2000s Arabic-language films
Films directed by Amos Gitai
Films set in Israel
Films produced by Marin Karmitz
2000s Hebrew-language films
Israeli multilingual films
2000s Russian-language films
Yiddish-language films